Wally Taylor (30 October 1926 – 2005) was an English professional footballer who played as a centre half.

Career
Born in Kirton in Lindsey, Taylor played forHibaldstow, Grimsby Town, Southport, Oldham Athletic and Brigg Town.

References

1926 births
2005 deaths
English footballers
Grimsby Town F.C. players
Southport F.C. players
Oldham Athletic A.F.C. players
Brigg Town F.C. players
English Football League players
Association football fullbacks
People from the Borough of North Lincolnshire